Fulvius imbecilis is a species of plant bug in the family Miridae. It is found in North America.

References

Further reading

External links

 

Cylapinae
Hemiptera of North America
Insects described in 1832
Taxa named by Thomas Say
Articles created by Qbugbot